Hilary Tjader Harris (December 9, 1929 – October 26, 1999) was a documentary filmmaker, one of the pioneers of time-lapse photography. The documentary, Seawards the Great Ships, directed by Harris, won the Academy Award for Best Live Action Short Film in 1962.

Filmography
 Longhorn (1951)
 Generation (1956)
 Highway (1958)
 Polaris Action 1960
 Seawards the Great Ships (1961)
 The Dialogues of Archibald Macleish and Mark Van Doren (1962)
 The Walk (1962)
 The Farmer and I (1963)
 Seas of Sweet Water (1964)
 The Squeeze (1964)
 Patterns for Communication (1966)
 9 Variations on a Dance Theme (1966)
 The Nuer (1970)
 Organism (1975)
 Technology in Public Service (1976)
 South Street Seaport (1976)

Notes 
A DVD, titled The Films of Hilary Harris, was released by Mystic Fire Video in 2006.  The four films on the DVD are Organism, 9 Variations, Highway and Longhorn. The DVD also includes an interview with Harris, which contains the short films Generation and Highway.

References

External links

1929 births
1999 deaths
American documentary filmmakers
Directors of Live Action Short Film Academy Award winners